A loose leaf (also loose leaf paper, filler paper or refill paper) is a piece of paper of any kind that is not bound in place, or available on a continuous roll, and may be punched so as to be organized in a ring binder. Loose leaf paper may be sold as free sheets, or made up into notepads, where perforations or glue allow them to be removed easily. "Leaf" in many languages refers to a sheet or page of paper, as in Folio, as in feuille de papier (French), hoja de papel (Spanish), foglio di carta (Italian), and ルーズリーフ (Japanese, "ru-zu ri-fu"). 

"Loose leaf" describes any kind of paper or book that is available in single sheets, unbound. Its "leaves", or sheets, are "loose" and not bound in notebook or book form. In North America, some textbooks are sold with prepunched holes and perforated pages, so that users can remove the pages and store them in a typical 3-ring binder. This helps in that the user is therefore able to carry only the part of book that is in use with them, without needing to carry the whole book.

Design 
There are four common types of loose leaves: ruled paper (wide ruled or college ruled), unruled, dotted and graph paper. College ruled paper has less space between the blue lines, allowing for more rows of writing. Wide ruled paper is intended for use by grade school children and those with larger handwriting.

Companies also sell pre-printed calendar loose leaves.

Special functionalities 
Rite in the Rain produces waterproof loose-leaf paper for outdoor (e.g. field) purposes.

Accessories 

 Card binder (for holding cards)
 Punched pocket (for inserting paper)
 Hole punch (for punching holes)

Advantages and disadvantages 
The chief advantage of loose-leaf paper is its flexibility and economy in use.  A punched sheet of paper can be inserted into a ring binder, removed for separate use, and then returned to the binder.  Different sheets can be organized into a different order in a binder, or removed entirely and refiled in another binder, or disposed of as needed.  This ability to rearrange and update the contents of binders is convenient for students and others, who can carry only the papers they are likely to need on a given day, while leaving the remainder elsewhere.  The ability to add or remove an arbitrary number of pages has been useful for reference works that are frequently updated, such as computer software manuals, parts catalogs, and legal indexes.  Or it need not be bound at all and can stand on its own as a single paper.

The chief disadvantage of loose-leaf paper is that individual pages can be easily removed or lost from its storage binder due to tearing or wear of the punched holes. Adhesive reinforcement labels or sheet protectors are available to make pages more durable, and ring binders are often equipped with sheet lifters or other features to reduce wear and damage to their paper contents.  Ring binders are sometimes banned from use for written journals, logs, or registers, which may even have pre-numbered permanently bound pages to discourage removal of pages, or at least allow a removal to be detected. Besides that, loose-leaf system may take up more space and be heavier compared to common glued or threadbound notebooks, due to the hinge (typically metal) involved.

Loose leaves in countries that use Letter-sized papers 
In U.S. and Canada, Letter-sized papers (8.5 x 11 inch) are used, and paper sizes are based on inches. The loose leaves in these countries have three punched holes on the left side of a paper, and the distance between two adjacent holes are set. The loose leaves may be exactly Letter-sized or smaller. Five Star sells Letter-sized loose leaves; Oxford and Mead sell 8 x 10.5 inch loose leaves. In libraries and print shops, hole punchers are regularly provided for punching 3 holes.

Some bound notebooks have perforated lines for tearing off pages, and all pages have pre-punched holes, so that when torn off, they can be organized into a binder directly.

Loose leaves in countries that use ISO paper standards 
In countries that use ISO paper standards (ISO 216), loose leaves of many different sizes are sold on the market.

Design 
See: Hole punch

ISO loose leaf typically has these number of holes:

Width of ruled lines 
The most common widths of ruled lines are 6mm, 7mm and 8mm. Some manufacturers sell 9mm and 10mm ruled paper as well, to accommodate special needs related to writing CJK characters, which takes up more space than alphabet-based scripts.

Accessories 
Many accessories are on the market, including punched zipper storage bag, punched "today"-ruler, card organizer, etc.

Different countries/regions 
ISO-sized loose leaves are most often designed and manufactured in Japan, mainland China and Taiwan.

Japan 
Japan is a major contributor to the market of ISO-sized loose leaves. In Japan, sizes of loose leaves such as A4, B5, A5, A6, A7 and special sizes such as "bible size / diary size" (e.g. by Raymay DaVinci) and are sold. Notable Japanese manufacturers include Kokuyo Co., Ltd. and Maruman Co. Ltd..

Kokuyo's products sell internationally and are available in the Chinese, European and North American markets as well.

MUJI (無印良品, see ) has retail stores worldwide, selling products including ISO-sized loose leaf paper, even in North America where ISO sizes are not commonly used.

Both Kokuyo and Maruman manufacture pre-printed calendar loose leaf packages sold for one calendar year.

Kokuyo's loose leaves are sold all over the world, and can be found in North American and European markets.

Lihit Lab produces a special type of loose leaf, with rectangular holes (instead of round ones) with non-standard spacings. Lihit Lab sells special ring binders to fit its loose leaves.

Maruman manufactures and sells a special size called Mini B7 (ミニ size, 86 x 128 mm).

Mainland China 
Many loose leaf products are imported from Japan to mainland China. Kokuyo sells Chinese market-specific versions of pre-printed calendar loose leaf packages.

Taiwan 
SEASON (四季纸品礼品) is a major manufacturer of different sizes of loose leaves in Taiwan.

History

Two early applications of looseleaf binding were Nelson's Perpetual Loose Leaf Encyclopaedia (1907) and legal textbooks updated through a 
looseleaf service (1914).

See also

Ring binder
Hole punch
Paper size
Ruled paper
Genkō yōshi
Graph paper
Post-it note

References 

History of Size
International standard paper sizes
Pre-Industrial Papermaking

External links 
 

Printing and writing paper